Cornelius Cecil Lucid (February 24, 1874 – June 25, 1931) was a 19th-century Irish born Major League Baseball pitcher and coach. He played from 1893 to 1897 in the National League.

Lucid's minor league baseball career spanned the period of 1890 to 1906. In addition to pitching as he had done in the Major Leagues, he also occasionally played outfielder as well. His two best seasons in the minor leagues were 1896 and 1904. In 1896 with three different teams, he had a record of 12–2 with an earned run average of 2.48 in 16 games. In 1904, he had a record of 13–8 in 21 games with the Pine Bluff Lumbermen.

Lucid managed and played for the Temple Boll Weevils of the Texas League during the entirety of the 1905 season and part of the 1906 season.

In 1915 Lucid served as the coach of the Texas A&M Aggies baseball team. During his one season, he had a record of 16–5 overall and a record of 6–5 in the Southwest Conference.

Lucid died of heart disease at age 57, in Houston, Texas.

See also
 List of players from Ireland in Major League Baseball

References

External links

 Baseball Almanac

1874 births
1931 deaths
19th-century baseball players
Irish emigrants to the United States (before 1923)
Major League Baseball pitchers
Brooklyn Grooms players
Louisville Colonels players
Philadelphia Phillies players
St. Louis Browns (NL) players
Galesburg (minor league baseball) players
Indianapolis (minor league baseball) players
Texas A&M Aggies baseball coaches
Webb City (minor league baseball) players
Spokane Bunchgrassers players
Butte (minor league baseball) players
Nashville Tigers players
Charleston Seagulls players
Macon Central City players
Macon Hornets players
Haverhill (minor league baseball) players
Philadelphia Athletics (minor league) players
Chambersburg Maroons players
Newark Colts players
Reading Actives players
Shreveport Giants players
Beaumont Oil Gushers players
Fort Worth Panthers players
Corsicana Oil Citys players
Pine Bluff Lumbermen players
Corsicana Oilers players
Galveston Sand Crabs players
Temple Boll Weevils players
Minor league baseball managers
Major League Baseball players from Ireland
Irish baseball players
Kokomo Wild Cats players